Robert "Rob" Schneiderman (born April 6, 1967) is an American professor and union president who was a Republican running for the U.S. House of Representatives for California's 45th congressional district in 2018.

Early life
Schneiderman was born in 1967 in Pasadena, California. He earned a Bachelor of Science in Family Resources and Human Development from Arizona State University in 1990 and earned a Master in Arts in Counseling from Chapman University.

Career
He has been a counselor at Orange Coast College since 1997. He was elected president of the Coast Federation of Educators (faculty union) in 2015 and reelected in 2017.

Controversy
Schneiderman publicly defended professor Olga Perez Stable-Cox after she made inflamitory remarks about the election of Donald Trump and his supporters.

References

1967 births
Living people
Arizona State University alumni
California Republicans
Chapman University alumni